Leporinus muyscorum is a species of freshwater fish in the genus Leporinus. It is endemic to Colombia, where it occurs in the Magdalena River Basin and Atrato River. The species was first described by Franz Steindachner in 1900.

Etymology 
The species epithet of Leporinus muyscorum refers to the Muisca, who inhabited the Altiplano Cundiboyacense in the upper course of the feeding Lebrija River. Spanish names for Leporinus muyscorum are moino, liseta, dentón, and comelón.

Description 
Distinct pairs breed on densely grown weedy places. The edible species is important in the freshwater fish culture in Colombia, as it adapts easily to artificial food. Leporinus muyscorum does not breed in captivity. The omnivorous species feeds on Luehea seemannii seeds, fish detritus and insects.

Habitat 
Leporinus muyscorum is found in the Magdalena River Basin, and the Ranchería, San Jorge, Sinú, Uré and Truandó Rivers. The type locality is the Lebrija River on the Altiplano Cundiboyacense in Santander. The fish also occurs in the Atrato River. The species has been classified as a Vulnerable species, due to intense overfishing. Its longevity is six to seven months, and three generations thus correspond to no more than 1.5 years. In 8 years, catch rates in the Atrato River have declined by 90%. Although catch rates are lower in other parts of its range, they have increased in the past few years. It is thus suspected that between 30 and 50% of the population has disappeared in 10 years due to overfishing.

See also 

 List of fishes in the Magdalena River
 List of flora and fauna named after the Muisca
 Biodiversity of Colombia

References

Bibliography 
 
 
 

Anostomidae
Endemic fauna of Colombia
Freshwater fish of Colombia
Fish of the Andes
Magdalena River
Altiplano Cundiboyacense
muyscorum
Fish described in 1900
Taxa named by Franz Steindachner